The Sharpenstine Farmstead is a historic farmhouse located at 98 East Mill Road near Long Valley in Washington Township, Morris County, New Jersey. It was added to the National Register of Historic Places on May 1, 1992, for its significance in architecture. The  farm overlooks the valley formed by the South Branch Raritan River. The house is part of the Stone Houses and Outbuildings in Washington Township Multiple Property Submission (MPS).

History
In 1749, the property was bought by John Peter Sharpenstine (1746–1826). In 1826, it was inherited by his son David Sharp (1786–1864).

Description
The central part of the farmhouse is a stone building with a gable roof and Federal style. The property has six contributing buildings, including the main house, a stone barn with a gambrel roof and a wagon house.

Gallery

See also
 National Register of Historic Places listings in Morris County, New Jersey
 German Valley Historic District

References

External links
 

Washington Township, Morris County, New Jersey
National Register of Historic Places in Morris County, New Jersey
Houses on the National Register of Historic Places in New Jersey
New Jersey Register of Historic Places
Houses in Morris County, New Jersey
Stone houses in New Jersey
Federal architecture in New Jersey
Farmhouses in the United States